The Bethel AME Church in Shelbyville, Kentucky is a historic African Methodist Episcopal church located at 414 Henry Clay Street.  It was built in 1916 and added to the National Register of Historic Places in 1984.

It was deemed notable as the "best example of integration of Gothic Revival and Classical Revival styles" among Shelbyville's churches, and it was asserted the "sanctuary is also important in the evolution of black religious life in Shelbyville."

It was listed as part of a larger study of historic resources in Shelbyville.

References

African Methodist Episcopal churches in Kentucky
National Register of Historic Places in Shelby County, Kentucky
Gothic Revival church buildings in Kentucky
Churches completed in 1916
20th-century Methodist church buildings in the United States
Churches on the National Register of Historic Places in Kentucky
Churches in Shelbyville, Kentucky
1916 establishments in Kentucky